The 2017 Meiji Yasuda J2 League (2017 明治安田生命J2リーグ) season was the 46th season of the second-tier club football in Japan and the 19th season since the establishment of J2 League.

Clubs

The participating clubs are listed in the following table:

Personnel and kits

Managerial changes

Foreign players

Players name in bold indicates the player is registered during the summer transfer window.

League table

Results

Play-offs

J1 League Promotion Playoffs
2017 J.League Road To J1 Play-Offs (2017 J1昇格プレーオフ)

Semifinals

Final

Nagoya Grampus was promoted to J1 League.

Season statistics

Top scorers
.

Attendances

References

J2 League seasons
2
Japan
Japan